Brig Bahnhofplatz railway station is a railway station in the municipality of Brig-Glis, in the Swiss canton of Valais. It is the meeting point of two  railway lines of the Matterhorn Gotthard Bahn, the BVZ Zermatt-Bahn and the Furka Oberalp Railway. Services at the station include the famed Glacier Express. The station is physically adjacent to the standard gauge Brig railway station, served by BLS AG and Swiss Federal Railways.

Services 
The following services stop at Brig Bahnhofplatz:

 Regio:

References

External links 
 

Railway stations in the canton of Valais
Matterhorn Gotthard Bahn stations
Brig-Glis